Farmhouse were a short lived Australian supergroup consisting of Georgie Parker (A Country Practice), Emily Symons (Home & Away), Julie McGregor and Chris Truswell (Hey Dad..!) and Michael Horrocks (Cartoon Connection). The group made a self-titled album consisting of ten cover songs.

Discography

Albums

Singles

References

1991 establishments in Australia
1992 disestablishments in Australia
Musical groups established in 1991
Musical groups disestablished in 1992